Radu Nicolae Zaharia (born 25 January 1989) is a Romanian professional footballer who plays as a full back. In the past he also played in Romania for teams such as: Gaz Metan Mediaș or Voluntari and in Cyprus for Ermis Aradippou.

References

External links

1989 births
Living people
People from Mediaș
Romanian footballers
Association football defenders
Liga I players
CS Gaz Metan Mediaș players
FC Voluntari players
FC Hermannstadt players
Cypriot First Division players
Ermis Aradippou FC players
Romanian expatriate footballers
Romanian expatriate sportspeople in Cyprus
Expatriate footballers in Cyprus
FC Unirea Dej players